West Virginia Route 72 is a north–south state highway in northern West Virginia. The southern terminus of the route is at West Virginia Route 32 southeast of Red Creek. The northern terminus is at West Virginia Route 7 east of Kingwood.

For much of the section between U.S. Route 219 east of Parsons and its southern end at West Virginia Route 32, WV 72 consists of a single paved lane with narrow gravel shoulders.  Trucks are prohibited on this stretch by prominently-posted signs.

Major intersections

References

Transportation in Tucker County, West Virginia
Transportation in Preston County, West Virginia
072